Sageretia subcaudata is a small woody shrub reaching a height of .  It has green, ovate leaves and white-yellow or white flowers.  The shrub is endemic to China and found in mountain forests and thickets of N Guangdong, Guizhou, W Henan, Hubei, Hunan, Jiangxi, S Shaanxi, E Sichuan, Tibet, and Yunnan provinces.

References

subcaudata
Endemic flora of China
Flora of Tibet
Plants described in 1914